The International Film Music Critics Association Award for Best Original Score for a Documentary is an annual award given by the International Film Music Critics Association, or the IFMCA. The award is given to the composer of a film or television score for an documentary deemed to be the best in a given year. The award was first given in 2008, for film documentary scores only. Since then, however, documentary series have been included into the category. It has been awarded under its current title since 2020.

Winners and nominees

2000s
Best Original Score for a Documentary Film

2010s

Best Original Score for a Documentary

2020s

References

International Film Music Critics Association Awards